The Bristol Cliffs Wilderness is one of eight wilderness areas in the Green Mountain National Forest in the U.S. state of Vermont. The area, near Lincoln, Vermont, is managed by the U.S. Forest Service. It was created by the Eastern Wilderness Areas Act of 1975, which makes it one of the oldest wilderness areas in the state.

The Eastern Wilderness Areas Act set aside  for Bristol Cliffs Wilderness, including  of private property claimed to have been improperly seized by eminent domain. On September 28–29, 1975, a subcommittee of the U.S. Senate held a public hearing in Bristol, Vermont to receive testimony on a bill intended to rectify the situation. The bill later passed Congress and was signed into law on April 16, 1976. This marked the first (and only) time in U.S. history that a wilderness area was subsequently reduced in size.

See also

 List of largest wilderness areas in the United States
 List of wilderness areas of the United States
 National Wilderness Preservation System
 Wilderness Act

References

Wilderness areas of Vermont
IUCN Category Ib
Protected areas of Addison County, Vermont
Green Mountain National Forest
Protected areas established in 1975
1975 establishments in Vermont